The New Basement Tapes is a British-American musical supergroup made up of members Jim James, Elvis Costello, Marcus Mumford, Taylor Goldsmith, and Rhiannon Giddens. The group is best known for Lost on the River: The New Basement Tapes, their 2014 album which consists of tracks based on newly uncovered lyrics handwritten by Bob Dylan in 1967 during the recording of his 1975 album with The Band, The Basement Tapes. The group is also featured in the 2014 Showtime documentary Lost Songs: The Basement Tapes Continued.

History
 
The New Basement Tapes were brought together in March 2014 to work with producer T Bone Burnett on putting together a new album with song lyrics penned by Bob Dylan in 1967. The group recorded dozens of songs over a two-week period in Capitol Records studio, with members of the group swapping instrumental and vocal roles on the different album tracks. The album was released in November 2014 by Electromagnetic Recordings via Harvest Records.

During the recording sessions, the group was filmed for a documentary for Showtime. Titled Lost Songs: The Basement Tapes Continued, the documentary is directed by Sam Jones and also contains an exclusive interview with Bob Dylan. It goes behind the scenes of the recording process and also discusses the story behind the discovery of the lost lyrics. Johnny Depp also appears in the documentary, having stopped by the studio to play guitar on the song "Kansas City".

Discography

References

American country rock groups
Harvest Records artists
Musical groups established in 2014
2014 establishments in the United States
Musical quintets
British supergroups
Rock music supergroups